"Next Plane Home" is the sixth single by the Canadian Grammy Award-nominated recording artist, singer-songwriter and pianist, Daniel Powter. It is the first single from his third studio album, Under the Radar. It is first released on August 20, 2008, in Japan.

Formats and track listings

CD Single
 "Next Plane Home"
 "Best Of Me" (Demo Version)
 "Free Loop" (Live from Studio A)

Music video
The music video for the song is directed by Markku Lahdesmaki on July 18, 2008. It is shot on a runway in a desert, Lancaster, California, which is located approximately 70 miles, 112.5 km, north, by road travel, of the city of Los Angeles in Southern California's Antelope Valley. The singer, Daniel Powter, is wearing a grey suit while playing the piano when some biplanes are flying around, waiting for his daughter to arrive.

Charts

References

2008 singles
2008 songs
Daniel Powter songs
Warner Records singles
Songs written by Rick Nowels
Songs written by Daniel Powter